Livistona boninensis is a species of flowering plant in the family Arecaceae (palms), native to the Bonin Islands of Japan. It has been introduced into the Volcano Islands, also Japanese.

References

boninensis
Flora of the Bonin Islands
Plants described in 1921